KC Masterpiece is a barbecue sauce that is marketed by the HV Food Products Company, a subsidiary of the Clorox Company.

History
KC Masterpiece Barbeque Sauce was created in 1977 by Richard E. "Rich" Davis M.D., a child psychiatrist practicing in Kansas City, Missouri, who had earned his medical degree from the University of Kansas. Davis was born in 1926, in Joplin, Missouri, and died on 6 October 2015 in Leawood, Kansas, at 89 years of age.

Initially, Davis named his sauce "KC Soul Style Barbecue Sauce" and the original formula consisted of only five ingredients. He later renamed it "KC Masterpiece". He presented his sauce to several Kansas City area food brokers with the intention of marketing it to the public through retail supermarket distribution. During this same time, he also presented Muschup (a combination of ketchup and mustard) and Dilled Muschup (a combination of ketchup, mustard, and dill relish). Most of the area brokerages were reluctant to give the upstart sauces a chance.   

Eventually, Davis met with Jim Flynn of Flynn Brokerage, who sampled the sauces and immediately saw the barbeque sauce’s potential to introduce an innovative product to an underserved sector of the retail market. Flynn began a grassroots marketing strategy, targeting local supermarkets with food sample demonstrations. The barbeque sauce sold more than 3,000 cases (36,000 bottles) the first weekend, and the stores actually ran out of inventory. The two Muschup varieties were also demonstrated but did not fare as well. In the following months and years, KC Masterpiece sales grew exponentially.

In 1986, after nearly ten years of success in the Kansas City area, Davis received an offer to sell the KC Masterpiece brand to the  Kingsford charcoal division of The HV Food Products Company (formally known as Hidden Valley Ranch Food Products, Inc.), which operates as a subsidiary of the Clorox Company, with an eye to marketing the sauce nationwide. In the agreement, Davis retained the right to use the sauce in restaurants that he was developing. Of the several restaurants that were subsequently opened, all eventually closed, the last one in 2009.

References

Further reading

External links
 Official website
 Restaurant Website
 American Royal biography

Culture of Kansas City, Missouri
Barbecue sauces
Brand name condiments
Clorox brands